Family Game is a 2007 Italian drama film directed by Alfredo Arciero.

Cast
Sandra Ceccarelli as Lisa
Stefano Dionisi as Vittorio
Fabio Troiano as Andrea
Mattia Cicinelli as Mattia
Elena Bouryka as Martina
Manuela Spartà as Valeria
Eros Pagni as the father

References

External links

2007 films
2000s Italian-language films
2007 drama films
Italian drama films
Films directed by Alfredo Arciero
2000s Italian films